Anti-Islam or anti-Muslim may refer to: 
Counter-jihad, a political current that views Islam as a threat to Western civilization
Criticism of Islam, criticism of the current or historical Islamic religion, its actions, teachings, omissions, structure, or nature
Islamophobia, the prejudice against, hatred, or bigotry towards the religion of Islam and Muslims
Persecution of Muslims, religious persecutions inflicted upon followers of the Islamic faith
War on Islam controversy, a perceived campaign to harm, weaken or annihilate the societal system of Islam